Sathyanarayana Srikanta, is a researcher in the field of Endocrinology worldwide. Currently he is serving as the medical director at Samatvam Endocrinology Diabetes Center  and Jnana Sanjeevini Medical Center  in Bangalore, India since 1993. He became faculty at the Harvard Medical School and Clinical Investigator of National Institute of Health, USA at the age of 29 years.

Education
Srikanta completed his MD in internal medicine from All India Institute of Medical Sciences (AIIMS), New Delhi, India. After this he was a fellow, faculty, and investigator for endocrinology, diabetes, and metabolism at Harvard Medical School, Brigham and Women's Hospital, and the Joslin Diabetes Center, US. He is also a Fellow at American College of Endocrinology (FACE).

Public life
Srikanta has been serving the poor in India through his active contributions over the past three decades at Samatvam Trust, namely DISHA, DOSTI  and DEEPA.

References

Year of birth missing (living people)
Living people
All India Institute of Medical Sciences, New Delhi alumni
Harvard Medical School faculty
Indian endocrinologists
Indian medical researchers